Oleg Aleksandrovich Oshenkov (27 May 1911 – 1 January 1976) was a Soviet association football player and coach. Merited Master of Sports of USSR (1953)

Born in the Russian capital, Saint Petersburg, Oshenkov spent all of his playing career in the city, while most of it playing for Dynamo Leningrad. As coach and manager, he worked with several clubs, including Dynamo Kyiv and Shakhtar.

In 1956 along with Anton Idzkovsky, Oshenkov was a head coach of the Ukraine national football team at the Summer Spartakiad of the Peoples of the USSR.

From 1971 through 1975 he chaired the Football Federation of Ukrainian SSR.

References

1911 births
1976 deaths
Soviet footballers
Soviet football managers
Ukrainian people of Russian descent
FC Dynamo Kyiv managers
MFC Mykolaiv managers
FC Shakhtar Donetsk managers
FC Metalist Kharkiv managers
Footballers from Saint Petersburg
FC Zenit Saint Petersburg players
Merited Coaches of the Soviet Union
Ukraine national football team managers
Football Federation of Ukraine chairmen
Association football midfielders
FC Dynamo Saint Petersburg players